Cancer root is a common name for several plants in the family Orobanchaceae, particularly genera:

Conopholis
Orobanche